Los Nevados National Natural Park is a national park located in the Cordillera Central of the Colombian Andes. The park surrounds the northern volcanic complex formed by Nevado del Ruiz, Nevado del Tolima, Nevado de Santa Isabel, the paramillos of Cisne, Santa Rosa and Quindío and the Cerro Bravo and Cerro Machín.

The park is located in the departments of Caldas, Quindío, Risaralda, Tolima and spans between the municipalities Manizales, Villamaría, Santa Rosa de Cabal, Pereira, Salento, Villahermosa, Anzoátegui, Santa Isabel, Murillo, Ibagué and Casabianca.

State of the Park 
Entrance through Brisas sector (northern sector of the Park) is only allowed to Valle de las Tumbas since the Servicio Geológico Colombiano has declared Nevado del Ruiz Volcano's activity at Yellow Alert Level (level III). It is highly recommend for visitors to consult the state of volcanic activity in the Servicio Geológico Colombiano's web page before their visit.

Geology
The Otún Lake, which lies in an extinct volcano crater, and the Green Lake are located in the area.

Hydrography 
The protected area is important for the region because of the countless sources of water that originate within. Glaciers occupy 4% of the area belonging to the three volcanoes, Nevado del Ruiz, Nevado de Santa Isabel and Nevado del Tolima. The melting waters from the glaciers give birth to the rivers that originate in the park and that conform 10 basins and 19 streams of different sizes and characteristics; six of the basins flow into the Magdalena River watershed (Gualí, Lagunilla, Recio, Totare and Coello) and the remaining four (Chinchiná, Campoalegre, Otún and Quindío) into the Cauca River watershed.

The park's hydrographic networks supply water to over for 2,000,000 inhabitants in the region, to coffee-growers and to most of the rice and cotton crops in the Tolima Department.

The Otún wetland system, located within the Park, was declared an internationally important Ramsar Convention wetland.

Glacial retreat 
In 2002, IDEAM warned about the alleged melting of the ice caps of the snow-capped mountains of the national park. Proof of this is the disappearance of the Ice Cathedrals, which were huge caverns in the lower part of the Nevado del Ruiz glacier, which existed before 1995 and which used to be frequented by climbers.

At the end of the 19th century, six glaciers existed on the peaks of El Ruiz, Santa Isabel, Tolima, El Cisne, Quindío and the current Paramillo de Santa Rosa, and were located at an altitude of 4500 meters above sea level.

The phenomenon of glacial retreat has worsened during the second half of the twentieth century. Of the former six existing glaciers, there are currently only three: El Nevado del Ruiz, Nevado de Santa Isabel and Nevado de Tolima. The three others had melted completely by the end of the 1970s. The surviving glaciers face a constant process of melting, the situation being critical for the Nevado del Tolima and Santa Isabel, whose area does not exceed two square kilometers. These two glaciers are expected to disappear completely between 2030 and 2040.

Flora and fauna
The park is composed of diverse ecosystems that change depending on the altitude. The lower regions of the park are composed of Andean forests, high Andean forests and high Andean wetlands. The higher regions of the park consist of the páramo and super-páramo ecosystems. The páramo is composed of grassland, peat bog, scrubland, swamps and lagoons and occupies 80% of the park's area. The super-páramo is a lunar-like landscape, composed of rocks, ashes, and sparse vegetation.

Flora 
The area is home to 1250 species of vascular plants, 200 bryophytes, 300 lichens and 180 macroscopic fungi. On the lower slopes and in the valleys the Andean wax palms are dominant. In the páramo, frailejones dominate the landscape and a range of mosses, lichens can be observed. Coulored algae can be found in the various lagoons.

Fauna 
Noteworthy birds include blue-crowned motmot, yellow-eared parrot, Fuertes's parrot, rufous-fronted parakeet, Andean condor, brown-banded antpitta and ruddy duck. The buffy helmetcrest hummingbird is endemic to the region. Noteworthy mammals include the mountain tapir, spectacled bear, northern pudú, oncilla, cougar and white-eared opossum.

Footnotes

References

External links

The park's page at Parques Nacionales Naturales de Colombia

Páramos
National parks of Colombia
Geography of Caldas Department
Geography of Quindío Department
Geography of Risaralda Department
Geography of Tolima Department
1973 establishments in Colombia
Tourist attractions in Caldas Department
Tourist attractions in Quindío Department
Tourist attractions in Risaralda Department
Tourist attractions in Tolima Department
Protected areas established in 1973